The administrator of the Environmental Protection Agency is the head of the United States Environmental Protection Agency (EPA), and is thus responsible for enforcing the nation's Clean Air and Clean Water Acts, as well as numerous other environmental statutes. The administrator is nominated by the president of the United States and must be confirmed by a vote of the Senate.

On March 10, 2021, Michael S. Regan was confirmed by a vote 66 to 34 as the administrator of the EPA, the first Black man to serve in this role.

Rank in the Cabinet 
Since the Clinton administration, the EPA administrator has been accorded cabinet rank by the president. The administrator of the EPA is equivalent to the position of Minister of the Environment in other countries. There have been various proposals to make the EPA a full executive department.

List of administrators

List of deputy administrators 
Robert W. Fri June 14, 1971 – April 29, 1973
John R. Quarles Jr. April 29, 1973 – January 20, 1977
Barbara Blum March 7, 1977 – January 20, 1981
John W. Hernandez Jr. May 20, 1981 – March 25, 1983
Alvin L. Alm August 5, 1983 – May 9, 1985
A. James Barnes May 10, 1985 – August 14, 1988
John A. Moore (Acting) August 15, 1988 – January 20, 1989(Acting) February 5, 1989 – May 18, 1989
F. Henry Habicht II May 19, 1989 – January 20, 1993
Jonathan Z. Cannon (Acting) March 8, 1993 – May 9, 1993
Robert M. Sussman May 10, 1993 – October 17, 1994
Fred Hansen October 18, 1994 – September 30, 1998
Peter D. Robertson (Acting) October 1, 1998 – December 7, 1999
W. Michael McCabe (Acting) December 8, 1999 – August 5, 2000August 6, 2000 – January 19, 2001
Linda Fisher May 31, 2001 – June 27, 2003
Stephen L. Johnson (Acting) July 12, 2003 – August 1, 2004August 2, 2004 – January 26, 2005
Marcus Peacock August 8, 2005 – January 20, 2009
Scott Fulton February 4, 2009 – December 24, 2009
Bob Perciasepe December 24, 2009 – August 8, 2014
Lisa Feldt (Acting) August 8, 2014 – October 7, 2014
Stan Meiburg (Acting) October 7, 2014 – January 20, 2017
Mike Flynn January 20, 2017 – April 3, 2018
Andrew R. Wheeler April 20, 2018 – February 28, 2019
Henry Darwin July 9, 2018 – September 2019
Janet McCabe April 29, 2021 – Present

Acting administrators 
Acting administrators usually assume the office in the interim period between the resignation of a previous administrator and the confirmation of his or her successor, including during the transition period between two presidential administrations, before the successor has been nominated and confirmed. Acting administrators come from within the EPA and usually hold an office that is subject to Senate confirmation before becoming the acting administrator. Linda Fisher and Stephen L. Johnson had served as Deputy Administrator when they became acting administrator. Marianne Lamont Horinko was an assistant administrator at the time. They are not subject to Senate confirmation to serve as the acting administrator, though to continue to serve as a full-fledged administrator (as in the case of Lee M. Thomas or Stephen L. Johnson), they must be confirmed by the Senate.

Line of succession 
The line of succession for the administrator of the Environmental Protection Agency is as follows:
Deputy Administrator of the Environmental Protection Agency
General Counsel
Assistant Administrator for the Office of Land and Emergency Management
Assistant Administrator for the Office of Chemical Safety and Pollution Prevention
Assistant Administrator for the Office of Air and Radiation
Assistant Administrator for the Office of Water
Assistant Administrator for the Office of Enforcement and Compliance Assurance
Chief Financial Officer
Assistant Administrator for the Office of Research and Development
Assistant Administrator for the Office of International and Tribal Affairs
Assistant Administrator for the Office of Administration and Resources Management
Assistant Administrator for the Office of Environmental Information
Regional Administrator, Region 7 (Kansas City, Kansas)
Principal Deputy General Counsel
Principal Deputy Assistant Administrator for the Office of Enforcement and Compliance Assurance
Deputy Regional Administrator, Region 2 (New York, New York)
Deputy Regional Administrator, Region 5 (Chicago, Illinois)

See also 
White House Office of Energy and Climate Change Policy
Presidential Task Force on the Auto Industry

References 

Administrators of the United States Environmental Protection Agency
Environmental Protection Agency